John Sidney Offer (1908–1985) was an English rower who won Silver Goblets at Henley Royal Regatta and a silver medal at the 1938 British Empire Games.

Offer was born at Hampton Wick, the son of Henry John Offer and his wife Vera Jennie Burgoine. His maternal
grandfather, Alfred Burgoine, was a boat designer who built one of Queen Victoria’s Royal Barges and a motor launch that held the world water speed record. He was educated at Tiffin School where he began rowing. He joined  Kingston Rowing Club where his brothers Tom and Dick Offer were also members.

Offer excelled at sculling, in particular partnering his brother Dick in the double sculls. They also took part in skiffing, being members of The Skiff Club. They won the Gentlemen's Double Sculls at the Skiff Championships Regatta in 1930, 1931, 1932, 1933 and 1935. Offer also won the Singles Skiff Championship in 1932 and 1935 and the Mixed Doubles Skiff Championship in 1933. In 1936 the Offer brothers won Silver Goblets  at Henley Royal Regatta.  Two years later they were selected to compete in the 1938 British Empire Games. In spite of the difficulties in maintaining training during the six-week sea voyage  to Australia they won the silver medal in the double sculls event.

References

1908 births
1985 deaths
People educated at Tiffin School
English male rowers
Rowers at the 1938 British Empire Games
Commonwealth Games gold medallists for England
Commonwealth Games silver medallists for England
Commonwealth Games medallists in rowing
Medallists at the 1938 British Empire Games